Tulsi Ram Khelwan is a Fijian political leader of Indian descent.  He served in the Senate from 2002 to 2006 as one of eight nominees of the Leader of the Opposition.

References

Fiji Labour Party politicians
Indian members of the Senate (Fiji)
Fijian Hindus
Living people
Year of birth missing (living people)
Place of birth missing (living people)